Joseph Knox Walker (July 19, 1818 – August 21, 1863) was an American politician and officer in the Confederate Army.

Early life
Walker was born on July 19, 1818, in Columbia, Tennessee. He was the son of James Walker, of Columbia, Tennessee, a nephew of President James K. Polk, and a brother of Lucius Marshall Walker. He graduated from Yale College in 1838.

Career
In March 1845, he became Private Secretary of President Polk and the signer of land-warrants. In 1858, he was a member of the Tennessee Senate.

Soon after the beginning of the American Civil War, he entered the Confederate States Army and became colonel of the 2nd Tennessee Infantry Regiment. Exposure in camp at Columbus, Kentucky, and afterward in the vicinity of the Siege of Corinth and Battle of Shiloh, impaired his health so seriously that he resigned his command. The United States Army general commanding the department permitted him to return home to Memphis, Tennessee. There, his strength gradually declined until he died.

Death
He died at the residence of his brother-in-law, Mr. Wm. S. Pickett, on August 21, 1863, aged about 46 years.

External links

Year of birth uncertain
1863 deaths
People from Columbia, Tennessee
Yale College alumni
Personal secretaries to the President of the United States
Confederate States Army officers
Tennessee state senators
1818 births
19th-century American politicians